East Meredith is a hamlet in Delaware County, New York, United States. East Meredith has a post office with ZIP code 13757, which opened on June 15, 1869.

References

Hamlets in Delaware County, New York
Hamlets in New York (state)